Plague Beasts is the third studio album by Cloak of Altering, released on April 29, 2014 by Crucial Blast.

Track listing

Personnel
Adapted from the Plague Beasts liner notes.
 Maurice de Jong (as Mories) –  vocals, instruments, recording, cover art

Release history

References

External links 
 
 Plague Beasts at Bandcamp

2014 albums
Cloak of Altering albums